There are three places called Queens Park in Victoria, Australia:
 Queens Park, Newtown, Victoria
 Queens Park, Lorne, Victoria
 Queens Park, Moonee Ponds in Victoria